"Susannah's Still Alive" is a song by Dave Davies, released for his second solo single.  The recording featured all of the Kinks' members as his backing band. It was a hit (peaking at #20 in the UK) but it did not live up to the expectations of Davies' last single "Death of a Clown", which was a Top 5 hit. It failed to chart in the US, but was a significant success in Europe, reaching #10 in the Netherlands, #27 in Germany, #18 in Belgium and #18 in Sweden. Although it was never featured on an LP, its B-side "Funny Face" was included on the Kinks' 1967 album Something Else by the Kinks.

Although all original UK singles used the spelling Suzanah, in many other countries and on later compilation albums Suzannah or Susannah was used.

Personnel 
According to band researcher Doug Hinman:

The Kinks
 Dave Davies lead vocal, electric guitar
 Ray Davies acoustic guitar, piano, harmonica
 Pete Quaife bass
 Mick Avory drums

Additional musician
 Nicky Hopkinspiano

Cardiacs version 

"Susannah's Still Alive" is the fourth single and only cover version ever recorded by Cardiacs.  As well as being released as a single, the track was also on the Kinks tribute album, Shangri-La - A Tribute to The Kinks.

Track listing

7"
 "Susannah's Still Alive"
 "Blind In Safety and Leafy In Love"

12"
 "Susannah's Still Alive"
 "Blind In Safety and Leafy In Love"
 "All His Geese Are Swans"

Lineup
 Tim Smith – guitar, vocals
 Jim Smith – bass
 Sarah Smith – saxophone
 William D. Drake – keyboards
 Dominic Luckman – drums
 Tim Quy – percussion

References

Sources

External links 
Dave Davies Official Site

1967 singles
1988 singles
The Kinks songs
Cardiacs songs
Songs written by Dave Davies
Pye Records singles
1967 songs
Song recordings produced by Ray Davies